Aleksi Sihvonen is the current vocalist for the Finnish band Medicated. He replaced Norther's vocalist Petri Lindroos in 2009, until the group disbanded in 2012. He was also the former guitarist and vocalist of Imperanon.

Personal information
Date of Birth: 2 April 1984
From: Helsinki, Finland
Instrument: Vocals, Guitar (stopped playing 2006)
Influences: Devin Townsend, Björn "Speed" Strid, Randy Blythe.
Started Playing:  Piano in 1991, guitar in 1997, death vocals in 2000 and started to clean sing from 2007.

Discography

With Norther

Frozen Angel  (His audition song, available for download on the Norther website)
Break Myself Away – released as online single on 29 April 2010
Circle Regenerated – Norther's sixth album, released 2011.

With Medicated
Magnum for Amen (2008 EP)
Ways to Make You Fall (2010 EP)

Imperanon
Until The End (2002 Demo)
Imperanon (2003 Demo)
Stained (2004 Album)
Demo 2006 (2006 Demo)

Guest appearances
Aleksi features on Scottish metal band Hellbound 's first EP, along with Heikki Saari of Norther. He features on the songs Misanthropy and Drug Thirsty Reptile. He also features on Serbian melodic death metal band Sangre Eterna 's album Asphyxia on the song The Masquerade. In 2012, Aleksi performed vocals on Canadian band Chariots of the Gods' song Unbound off their album and single entitled Tides of War.

Sources
All of the information in this article was compiled from information on the Official Norther website, the Official Norther Forum, and the EndlessWar member information page

External links
Official Medicated Website
Official Medicated Facebook page
Official Norther website
Official Norther MySpace -profile
EndlessWar, an extensive fansite
Aleksi's official MySpace
NORTHER – the Finnish Breeze fansite (Archived 2009-10-25)
Russian Norther Fansite
Aleksi at Metal From Finland

1984 births
Singers from Helsinki
Living people
Finnish heavy metal musicians
21st-century Finnish singers
Norther members